The Swedish Saddlemakers' and Upholsterers' Union (SSoT) was a trade union representing workers in leather goods in Sweden.

Background 
The union was founded on 2 September 1894 in Malmö as the Scandinavian Saddlemakers' and Upholsterers' Union.  It established headquarters in Copenhagen, and was an early affiliate of the Swedish Trade Union Confederation.  It grew from an initial 70 members to 1,980 in 1930.  That year, it relocated its headquarters to Sweden, and from 1939 it restricted membership to Sweden, adopting its final name.  Membership increased to a peak of 5,721 in 1950, then fell slightly to 4,974 in 1961.  The following year, it dissolved, with about 4,000 members, working in upholstery, transferring to the Swedish Wood Industry Workers' Union, while the remainder working in saddlery transferred to the Swedish Shoe and Leather Workers' Union.

References

Leather industry trade unions
Trade unions established in 1894
Trade unions disestablished in 1962
Trade unions in Sweden